Chrétien is a given name and surname. In the French language, Chrétien is the masculine form of "Christian", as noun, adjective or adverb.  Notable people with the name include:

Given name 
 Chrétien de Troyes, 12th-century French poet
 Chrétien Le Clercq, 17th-century Roman Catholic missionary
 Chrétien-Louis-Joseph de Guignes (1759–1845), French merchant-trader, diplomat and scholar
 Gilles-Louis Chrétien (1754–1811) inventor of the physionotrace
 Chrétien Urhan (1790–1845), French musician and composer
 Henri Chrétien, (1879–1956), French astronomer and inventor

Surname 
 Jean Chrétien (born 1934), 20th prime minister of Canada (serving 1993–2003), and former leader of the Liberal Party of Canada (serving 1990–2003) also:
Aline Chrétien (1936–2020), his wife
 Michel Chrétien (born 1936), his brother
 Raymond Chrétien (born 1942), former Canadian ambassador to the United States, his nephew
 Jean-Guy Chrétien (born 1946), Canadian politician
 Jean-Louis Chrétien, (1952-2019), French philosopher
 Jean-Loup Chrétien (born 1938), French astronaut
 Paul Chrétien, (1862-1948), French general
 Pierre Chrétien (1846–1934), French entomologist 
 Todd Chretien (born 1969), contemporary U.S. activist

See also

Chrétien (crater), on the Moon